The enzyme alkaline phosphatase (EC 3.1.3.1, alkaline phosphomonoesterase; phosphomonoesterase; glycerophosphatase; alkaline phosphohydrolase; alkaline phenyl phosphatase; orthophosphoric-monoester phosphohydrolase (alkaline optimum), systematic name phosphate-monoester phosphohydrolase (alkaline optimum)) catalyses the following reaction:

 a phosphate monoester + H2O = an alcohol + phosphate

Alkaline phosphatase has the physiological role of dephosphorylating compounds. The enzyme is found across a multitude of organisms, prokaryotes and eukaryotes alike, with the same general function but in different structural forms suitable to the environment they function in. Alkaline phosphatase is found in the periplasmic space of E. coli bacteria. This enzyme is heat stable and has its maximum activity at high pH. In humans, it is found in many forms depending on its origin within the body – it plays an integral role in metabolism within the liver and development within the skeleton. Due to its widespread prevalence in these areas, its concentration in the bloodstream is used by diagnosticians as a biomarker in helping determine diagnoses such as hepatitis or osteomalacia.

The level of alkaline phosphatase in the blood is checked through the ALP test, which is often part of routine blood tests. The levels of this enzyme in the blood depend on factors such as age, sex, or blood type. Blood levels of alkaline phosphatase also increase by two to four times during pregnancy. This is a result of additional alkaline phosphatase produced by the placenta and the liver. Additionally, abnormal levels of alkaline phosphatase in the blood could indicate issues relating to the liver, gall bladder or bones. Kidney tumors and infections as well as malnutrition have also shown abnormal level of alkaline phosphatase in blood. Alkaline phosphatase levels in a cell can be measured through a process called "The scoring method". A blood smear is usually taken and stained to categorize each leukocyte into specific "leukocyte alkaline phosphatase indices". This marker is designed to distinguish leukocytes and determine different enzyme activity from each sample's extent of staining.

Bacterial
In Gram-negative bacteria, such as Escherichia coli, alkaline phosphatase is located in the periplasmic space, external to the inner cell membrane and within the peptidoglycan portion of the cell wall. Since the periplasmic gap is more prone to environmental variation than the inner cell, alkaline phosphatase is suitably resistant to inactivation, denaturation, or degradation. This characteristic of the enzyme is uncommon to many other proteins.

The precise structure and function of the isozyme in E. coli is solely geared to supply a source of inorganic phosphate when the environment lacks this metabolite. The inorganic phosphates are then bound to carrier proteins which deliver the inorganic phosphates to a specific high-affinity transport system, known as the phosphate-specific transport system (Pst system), which transports phosphate across the cytoplasmic membrane.

While the outer membrane of E. coli contains porins that are permeable to phosphorylated compounds, the inner membrane does not. An issue arises in how to transport such compounds across the inner membrane and into the cytosol. The strong anionic charge of phosphate groups along with the remainder of the compound make phosphorylated compounds very much immiscible in the nonpolar region of the bilayer. The solution arises in cleaving the phosphate group away from the compound via ALP. The dephosphorylation reaction that ALP catalyzes yields pure inorganic phosphate, which can be ultimately targeted by the Pst system for translocation into the cytosol, with concomitant production of a dephosphorylated compound. As such, the main purpose of dephosphorylation by alkaline phosphatase is to increase the rate of diffusion of phosphorylated molecules into the cells while inhibiting them from diffusing out.

Alkaline phosphatase is a zinc-containing dimeric enzyme with the MW: 86,000 Da, each subunit containing 429 amino acids with four cysteine residues linking the two subunits. Alkaline phosphatase contains four Zn ions and two Mg ions, with Zn occupying active sites A and B, and Mg occupying site C, so the fully active native alkaline phosphatase is referred to as (ZnAZnBMgC)2 enzyme. The mechanism of action of alkaline phosphatase involves the geometric coordination of the substrate between the Zn ions in the active sites, whereas the Mg site doesn't appear to be close enough to directly partake in the hydrolysis mechanism, however, it may contribute to the shape of the electrostatic potential around the active center. 

Alkaline phosphatase in E. coli is uncommonly soluble and active within elevated temperature conditions such as 80 °C. Due to the kinetic energy induced by this temperature the weak hydrogen bonds and hydrophobic interactions of common proteins become degraded and therefore coalesce and precipitate. However, upon dimerization of alkaline phosphatase the bonds maintaining its secondary and tertiary structures are effectively buried such that they are not affected as much at this temperature. Furthermore, even at more elevated temperatures such as 90 °C alkaline phosphatase has the unusual characteristic of reverse denaturation. Due to this, although it ultimately denatures at about 90 °C it has the added ability to accurately reform its bonds and return to its original structure and function once cooled back down.

Alkaline phosphatase in E. coli is located in the periplasmic space and can thus be released using techniques that weaken the cell wall and release the protein. Due to the location of the enzyme, and the protein layout of the enzyme, the enzyme is in solution with a smaller amount of proteins than there are in another portion of the cell.
 The proteins' heat stability can also be taken advantage of when isolating this enzyme (through heat denaturation). In addition, alkaline phosphatase can be assayed using p-Nitrophenyl phosphate. A reaction where alkaline phosphatase dephosphorylates the non-specific substrate, p-Nitrophenyl phosphate in order to produce p-Nitrophenol(PNP) and inorganic phosphate. PNP's yellow color, and its λmax at 410 allows spectrophotometry to determine important information about enzymatic activity. Some complexities of bacterial regulation and metabolism suggest that other, more subtle, purposes for the enzyme may also play a role for the cell. In the laboratory, however, mutant Escherichia coli lacking alkaline phosphatase survive quite well, as do mutants unable to shut off alkaline phosphatase production.

The optimal pH for the activity of the E. coli enzyme is 8.0 while the bovine enzyme optimum pH is slightly higher at 8.5. Alkaline phosphatase accounts for 6% of all proteins in derepressed cells.

Intragenic complementation

When multiple copies of a polypeptide encoded by a gene form an aggregate, this protein structure is referred to as a multimer.  When a multimer is formed from polypeptides produced by two different mutant alleles of a particular gene, the mixed multimer may exhibit greater functional activity than the unmixed multimers formed by each of the mutants alone.  In such a case, the phenomenon is referred to as intragenic complementation.  E. coli alkaline phosphatase, a dimer enzyme, exhibits intragenic complementation.  When particular mutant versions of alkaline phosphatase were combined, the heterodimeric enzymes formed as a result exhibited a higher level of activity than would be expected based on the relative activities of the parental enzymes.  These findings indicated that the dimer structure of E.coli alkaline phosphatase allows cooperative interactions between the constituent monomers that can generate a more functional form of the holoenzyme.

Use in research
By changing the amino acids of the wild-type alkaline phosphatase enzyme produced by Escherichia coli, a mutant alkaline phosphatase is created which not only has a 36-fold increase in enzyme activity, but also retains thermal stability. Typical uses in the lab for alkaline phosphatases include removing phosphate monoesters to prevent self-ligation, which is undesirable during plasmid DNA cloning.

Common alkaline phosphatases used in research include:
 Shrimp alkaline phosphatase (SAP), from a species of Arctic shrimp (Pandalus borealis). This phosphatase is easily inactivated by heat, a useful feature in some applications.
 Calf-intestinal alkaline phosphatase (CIP)
 Placental alkaline phosphatase (PLAP) and its C terminally truncated version that lacks the last 24 amino acids (constituting the domain that targets for GPI membrane anchoring) – the secreted alkaline phosphatase (SEAP). It presents certain characteristics like heat stability, substrate specificity, and resistance to chemical inactivation.
 Human-intestinal alkaline phosphatase. The human body has multiple types of alkaline phosphatase present, which are determined by a minimum of three gene loci. Each one of these three loci controls a different kind of alkaline phosphatase isozyme. However,  the development of this enzyme can be strictly regulated by other factors  such as thermostability, electrophoresis, inhibition, or immunology.

Human-intestinal alkaline phosphatase shows around 80% homology with the bovine intestinal enzyme which holds true their shared evolutionary origins. That same bovine enzyme has more than 70% homology with human placental enzyme. However, the human liver enzyme and the placental enzyme only share 20% homology despite their structural similarities.

Alkaline phosphatase has become a useful tool in molecular biology laboratories, since DNA normally possesses phosphate groups on the 5' end. Removing these phosphates prevents the DNA from ligating (the 5' end attaching to the 3' end), thereby keeping DNA molecules linear until the next step of the process for which they are being prepared; also, removal of the phosphate groups allows radiolabeling (replacement by radioactive phosphate groups) in order to measure the presence of the labeled DNA through further steps in the process or experiment. For these purposes, the alkaline phosphatase from shrimp is the most useful, as it is the easiest to inactivate once it has done its job.

Another important use of alkaline phosphatase is as a label for enzyme immunoassays.

Undifferentiated pluripotent stem cells have elevated levels of alkaline phosphatase on their cell membrane, therefore alkaline phosphatase staining is used to detect these cells and to test pluripotency (i.e., embryonic stem cells or embryonal carcinoma cells).

There is a positive correlation between serum bone alkaline phosphatase levels and bone formation in humans, although its use as a biomarker in clinical practice is not recommended.

Ongoing research
Current researchers are looking into the increase of tumor necrosis factor-α and its direct effect on the expression of alkaline phosphatase in vascular smooth muscle cells as well as how alkaline phosphatase (AP) affects the inflammatory responses and may play a direct role in preventing organ damage.
 Alkaline phosphatase (AP) affects the inflammatory responses in patients with Chronic kidney disease and is directly associated with Erythropoiesis stimulating agent resistant anemia.
 Intestinal alkaline phosphatase (IAP) and the mechanism it uses to regulate pH and ATP hydrolysis in rat duodenum.
 Testing the effectiveness of the inhibitor and its impact on IAP in acute intestinal inflammation as well as explore the  molecular mechanisms of IAP in "ameliorating intestinal permeability."

Dairy industry

Alkaline phosphatase is commonly used in the dairy industry as an indicator of successful pasteurization. This is because the most heat stable bacterium found in milk, Mycobacterium paratuberculosis, is destroyed by temperatures lower than those required to denature the enzyme. Therefore, its presence is ideal for indicating failed pasteurization.

Pasteurization verification is typically performed by measuring the fluorescence of a solution which becomes fluorescent when exposed to active alkaline phosphatase. Fluorimetry assays are required by milk producers in the UK to prove alkaline phosphatase has been denatured, as p-Nitrophenylphosphate tests are not considered accurate enough to meet health standards.

Alternatively the colour change of p-nitrophenylphosphate as substrate in a buffered solution (Aschaffenburg Mullen Test) can be used. Raw milk would typically produce a yellow coloration within a couple of minutes, whereas properly pasteurised milk should show no change. There are exceptions to this, as in the case of heat-stable alkaline phosphatases produced by some bacteria, but these bacteria should not be present in milk.

Inhibitors
All mammalian alkaline phosphatase isoenzymes except placental (PALP and SEAP) are inhibited by homoarginine, and, in similar manner, all except the intestinal and placental ones are blocked by levamisole. Phosphate is another inhibitor which competitively inhibits alkaline phosphatase.

Another known example of an alkaline phosphatase inhibitor is [(4-Nitrophenyl)methyl]phosphonic acid.

In metal contaminated soil, alkaline phosphatase are inhibited by Cd (Cadmium).  In addition, temperature enhances the inhibition of Cd on the enzyme activity, which is shown in the increasing values of Km.

Human

Physiology
In humans, alkaline phosphatase is present in all tissues throughout the body, but is particularly concentrated in the liver, bile duct, kidney, bone, intestinal mucosa and placenta. In the serum, two types of alkaline phosphatase isozymes predominate: skeletal and liver. During childhood the majority of alkaline phosphatase are of skeletal origin. Humans and most other mammals contain the following alkaline phosphatase isozymes:
 ALPI – intestinal (molecular mass of 150 kDa)
 ALPL – tissue-nonspecific (expressed mainly in liver, bone, and kidney)
 ALPP – placental (Regan isozyme)
 ALPG – germ cell
Four genes encode the four isozymes. The gene for tissue-nonspecific alkaline phosphatase is located on chromosome 1, and the genes for the other three isoforms are located on chromosome 2.

Intestinal alkaline phosphatase 
Intestinal alkaline phosphatase is secreted by enterocytes, and seems to play a pivotal role in intestinal homeostasis and protection as well as in suppressing inflammation via repression of the downstream Toll-like receptor (TLR)-4-dependent and MyD88-dependent inflammatory cascade. It dephosphorylates toxic/inflammatory microbial ligands like lipopolysaccharides (LPSs), unmethylated cytosine-guanine dinucleotides, flagellin, and extracellular nucleotides such as uridine diphosphate or ATP. Dephosphorylation of LPS by IAP can reduce the severity of Salmonella tryphimurium and Clostridioides difficile infection restoring normal gut microbiota. Thus, altered IAP expression has been implicated in chronic inflammatory diseases such as inflammatory bowel disease (IBD). It also seems to regulate lipid absorption and bicarbonate secretion in the duodenal mucosa, which regulates the surface pH. Since the 1960s intestinal alkaline phosphatase has been utilized in drug delivery. As it cleaves phosphate substructures from drugs, auxiliary agents, and even from the surface of nanocarriers, this enzyme enables the design of drug delivery systems that can alter their properties in the body on demand. The solubility of many drugs can be substantially improved by the design of phosphate prodrugs. On the intestinal mucosa the phosphate substructures are cleaved off by alkaline phosphatase and the drug is absorbed. Furthermore, anionic nanocarriers exhibiting bioinert properties can alter their surface to interactive once having reached the intestinal epithelium as due to an alkaline phosphatase triggered cleavage of anionic phosphate groups from their surface charge converts to cationic improving for instance cellular uptake.

In cancer cells

Studies show that the alkaline phosphatase protein found in cancer cells is similar to that found in nonmalignant body tissues and that the protein originates from the same gene in both. One study compared the enzymes of liver metastases of giant-cell lung carcinoma and nonmalignant placental cells. The two were similar in NH2-terminal sequence, peptide map, subunit molecular weight, and isoelectronic point.

In a different study in which scientists examined alkaline phosphatase protein presence in a human colon cancer cell line, also known as HT-29, results showed that the enzyme activity was similar to that of the non-malignant intestinal type. However, this study revealed that without the influence of sodium butyrate, alkaline phosphatase activity is fairly low in cancer cells. A study based on sodium butyrate effects on cancer cells conveys that it has an effect on androgen receptor co-regulator expression, transcription activity, and also on histone acetylation in cancer cells. This explains why the addition of sodium butyrate show increased activity of alkaline phosphatase in the cancer cells of the human colon. In addition, this further supports the theory that alkaline phosphatase enzyme activity is actually present in cancer cells.

In another study, choriocarcinoma cells were grown in the presence of 5-bromo-2'-deoxyuridine and results conveyed a 30- to 40-fold increase in alkaline phosphatase activity. This procedure of enhancing the activity of the enzyme is known as enzyme induction. The evidence shows that there is in fact activity of alkaline phosphatase in tumor cells, but it is minimal and needs to be enhanced. Results from this study further indicate that activities of this enzyme vary among the different choriocarcinoma cell lines and that the activity of the alkaline phosphatase protein in these cells is lower than in the non-malignant placenta cells. but levels are significantly higher in children and pregnant women. Blood tests should always be interpreted using the reference range from the laboratory that performed the test. High alkaline phosphatase levels can occur if the bile ducts are obstructed.

Also, the level of alkaline phosphatase increases if there is active bone formation occurring, as the enzyme is a byproduct of osteoblast activity (such as the case in Paget's disease of bone).

The level of alkaline phosphatase is much more elevated in metastatic prostate cancer cells than non-metastatic prostate cancer cells. High levels of ALP in prostate cancer patients is associated with a significant decrease in survival.

Levels are also elevated in people with untreated coeliac disease. Lowered levels of the level of alkaline phosphatase are less common than elevated levels. The source of elevated levels can be deduced by obtaining serum levels of γ-glutamyltransferase. Concomitant increases of alkaline phosphatase with γ-glutamyltransferase should raise the suspicion of hepatobiliary disease.

Some diseases do not affect the levels of alkaline phosphatase, for example, hepatitis C. A high level of this enzyme does not reflect any damage in the liver, even though high alkaline phosphatase levels may result from a blockage of flow in the biliary tract or an increase in the pressure of the liver.

Elevated levels 

If it is unclear why the level of alkaline phosphatase is elevated, isoenzyme studies using electrophoresis can confirm the source of the increase. Skelphosphatase (which is localized in osteoblasts and extracellular layers of newly synthesized matrix) is released into circulation by a yet unclear mechanism. Placental alkaline phosphatase is elevated in seminomas and active forms of rickets, as well as in the following diseases and conditions:
 Biliary obstruction
 Bone conditions
 Osteoblastic bone tumors
 Osteomalacia
 Osteoporosis
 Hepatitis
 Cirrhosis
 Acute cholecystitis
 Myelofibrosis
 Leukemoid reaction
 Lymphoma
 Paget's disease
 Sarcoidosis
 Hyperthyroidism
 Hyperparathyroidism
 Myocardial infarction
 Pregnancy
 Very high doses of estrogens

Lowered levels 

The following conditions or diseases may lead to reduced levels of alkaline phosphatase:
 Hypophosphatasia, a genetic disorder
 Women receiving estrogen therapy for menopausal symptoms
 Estrogen-containing oral contraceptives
 Men with recent heart surgery, malnutrition, magnesium deficiency, or severe anemia
 Children with achondroplasia and congenital iodine deficiency
 Children after a severe episode of enteritis
 Pernicious anemia
 Aplastic anemia
 Wilson's disease
 Hypothyroidism
 Zinc deficiency
 Malnutrition
 Steroid treatment
 Colitis

Prognostic uses 
Measuring alkaline phosphatase (along with prostate specific antigen) during, and after six months of hormone treated metastatic prostate cancer was shown to predict the survival of patients.

Leukocyte alkaline phosphatase 
Leukocyte alkaline phosphatase is found within mature white blood cells. White blood cell levels of LAP can help in the diagnosis of certain conditions.
 Higher than typical levels are seen in the physiological response, the leukemoid reaction, and in pathologies that include mature white blood cells, such as polycythemia vera, essential thrombocytosis, and in primary myelofibrosis.
 Lower than typical levels are found in pathologies that involve undeveloped leukocytes, such as chronic myelogenous leukemia (CML), paroxysmal nocturnal hemoglobinuria and acute myelogenous leukaemia.

Structure and properties 
Alkaline phosphatase is homodimeric enzyme, meaning it is formed with two molecules. Three metal ions, two Zn and one Mg, are contained in the catalytic sites, and both types are crucial for enzymatic activity to occur. The enzymes catalyze the hydrolysis of monoesters in phosphoric acid which can additionally catalyze a transphosphorylation reaction with large concentrations of phosphate acceptors. While the main features of the catalytic mechanism and activity are conserved between mammalian and bacterial alkaline phosphate, mammalian alkaline phosphatase has a higher specific activity and Km values thus a lower affinity, more alkaline pH optimum, lower heat stability, and are typically membrane bound and are inhibited by l-amino acids and peptides via a means of uncompetitive mechanism. These properties noticeably differ between different mammalian alkaline phosphatase isozymes and therefore showcase a difference in in vivo functions.

Alkaline phosphatase has homology in a large number of other enzymes and composes part of a superfamily of enzymes with several overlapping catalytic aspects and substrate traits. This explains why most salient structural features of mammalian alkaline are the way they are and reference their substrate specificity and homology to other members of the nucleoside pyrophosphatase/phosphodiesterase family of isozyme. Research has shown a relationship between members of the alkaline phosphatase family with aryl sulfatases. The similarities in structure indicate that these two enzyme families came from a common ancestor. Further analysis has linked alkaline phosphates and aryl sulfatases to a larger superfamily. Some of the common genes found in this superfamily, are ones that encode phosphodiesterases as well as autotoxin.

See also 
 Acid phosphatase
 Liver function tests

References

Further reading

External links 
 Alkaline phosphatase at Lab Tests Online

EC 3.1.3
Liver function tests